Piano Sonata in B-flat minor may refer to:

 Piano Sonata No. 2 (Chopin)
 Piano Sonata No. 2 (Rachmaninoff)
 Piano Sonata (Reubke)